Cathrin Carlzon (born 25 April 1983) is a Swedish Olympic swimmer. She competed in the 2004 Summer Olympics, where she swam the 4×100 m freestyle preliminary round.

Clubs
Södertörns SS

References

1983 births
Living people
Swimmers at the 2004 Summer Olympics
Olympic swimmers of Sweden
European Aquatics Championships medalists in swimming
Södertörns SS swimmers
Swedish female freestyle swimmers